Geoffrey Benjamin Pike (born 13 May 1954) is an Australian boxer. He competed in the men's light heavyweight event at the 1980 Summer Olympics.

References

1954 births
Living people
Australian male boxers
Olympic boxers of Australia
Boxers at the 1980 Summer Olympics
Place of birth missing (living people)
Light-heavyweight boxers